Far Meadow is a locality in the City of Shoalhaven in New South Wales, Australia. It lies to the south of Coolangatta Road to the southeast of Berry.

Far Meadow had a public school from June 1897 to December 1970.

References

City of Shoalhaven
Localities in New South Wales